Korean dogwood is a common name for several dogwoods that occur in Korea, and may refer to:

Cornus coreana, rarely cultivated as an ornamental plant
Cornus kousa, a widely cultivated ornamental plant

Cornus